Egalitarian communities are groups of people who have chosen to live together, with egalitarianism as one of their core values. A broad definition of egalitarianism is "equal access to resources and to decision-making power." For example, decision-making is done by consensus or another system in which each person has a voice; it is not done hierarchically with only one or a few people making choices that will affect the whole group. If the group shares assets (income, vehicles, etc.), they are distributed equitably throughout the group, and each member has access to more-or-less the same resources as any other member. Egalitarian communities are a type of commune (some communal groups are not egalitarian in nature).

An "egalitarian decision" is a decision made by a group as opposed to a single individual. The decision may be made by committee or elected members but still is an egalitarian decision.

The Federation of Egalitarian Communities is a network of communal groups in North America with values including egalitarianism, non-violence, income-sharing and cooperation.

See also
 Acorn Community
 Drop City
 East Wind Community
 Equality Colony
 Kommune Niederkaufungen
 L'Arche
 Twin Oaks Community

External links
 Dacha Project
 Federation of Egalitarian Communities
 Intentional Communities Website
 Directory of Communes in the Communities Directory
 Communities magazine
 Intentional Communities Wiki
 Twin Oaks Communities Conference Conference focused on education about living in Community.

 
Types of communities